War and Beauty is a Hong Kong television period drama serial that originally aired on TVB Jade from 23 August to 2 October 2004, consisting of 30 episodes. It stars TVB Best Actress winners Sheren Tang (2009/2010), Maggie Cheung (2003), Charmaine Sheh (2006/2014), and Gigi Lai (2004 - she won the award for her work in this drama). It also stars TVB Best Actor winners Bowie Lam (2004 - he also won the award for his work in this drama) and Moses Chan (2007). It received widespread praise among critics and audiences for its acting and plot. It continues to remain one of the most popular TVB dramas and is often referenced as the first drama series that sparked the popularity for palace scheming dramas in Hong Kong such as Beyond the Realm of Conscience and Mainland Chinese dramas including Empresses in the Palace, Story of Yanxi Palace and Ruyi's Royal Love in the Palace. In 2022, the drama was selected as one of ten classic TVB dramas being honoured for a new joint Youku and TVB programme. In 2022, Tang, Cheung, and Sheh reprised their roles for the Zhejiang Television, Youku, and TVB-produced variety show Memories Beyond Horizon.

Synopsis
This show was set in the Forbidden City, in Qing dynasty China in the late years of the Jiaqing Emperor's rule. It focused on the power struggle between various royal concubines trying to secure the Emperor's favor, with corruption, intrigue and outright deceit being the weapons of choice. These women were willing to manipulate, betray and even kill just about anyone in order to get what they wanted.

Throughout the later parts of the series, the inevitable results of this corruption become increasingly apparent. The main characters start to lose everything they care for, while being forced to conclude that they have only themselves to blame. In the meantime, corruption takes its toll on the outside world as well: the entire empire is destabilizing.

Ending
At the end of the series, many things come to a head. As the corruption of Qing politics became all the more prevalent, the people of the country organize an armed rebellion. The rebellion was led by Hung-Mo's fraternal brother, Chen Shuang, who felt wronged during his time in the Palace and is seeking revenge. The rebel invasion of the Palace opened up some interesting opportunities, especially for the Empress, who tried to kill off her opposition and blame it on the rebels.

Sun Bak-Yeung made an attempt to use the situation to escape with Yi-Sun and Yuk-Ying. However, Yuk-Ying refusing to give up power, was unwilling to go with them, and Sun Bak-Yeung makes Hung-Mo promise that he will take Yi-Sun out of the Forbidden Palace. Despite Yi-Sun's pleas, Sun Baiyang leaves to find Yuk-Ying residence to confront her. While the two were in Yuk-Ying's residence, the Empress' guards boards up the entrances and sets it on fire, causing both to be burned alive together. Sun Bak-Yeung's father, Sun Qinghwa, finds out about his son's death when a raven carrying his son's jade band drops it right in front of him as he waited for his son.

On-Seen, whose plan to exact revenge on the Empress for her grandmother's death was scuppered, hatched plans to leave the Palace with Hung-Mo and Yi-Sun, who had lost all will to live in the Palace after her adoptive father, Xu Wan Tian, died. At the same time, Yu-Yuet was also invited to leave but realizing she can no longer live a normal civilian life since she entered the Palace at the age of 16, she chooses to stay. Having survived an attack by several guards dressed up as rebels and having realized the true fate of Sun Bak-Yeung and Yuk-Ying, she confronts the Empress directly at her residence and vows take her down.

As the trio leaves the palace, On-seen was seen shot by a stray arrow. She dies on Hung-Mo's shoulder without him being aware while escaping in a horse cart. In the end, only Hung-Mo and Yi-Sun successfully leave the palace as Yu-Yuet looks on from the palace.

Cast
 Note: Some of the characters' names are in Cantonese romanisation.

Popularity and reception

Themes 
Amongst Hong Kong's office workers, the feuding and shifting alliances of the Imperial women, with greater issues being sacrificed for personal piques and gains was taken as a metaphor for the office politics familiar to many. The exploits of their characters were followed in minute detail in online forums, with each betrayal or stab in the back leading to flaming, denunciations, accusations and denials amongst the rival factions.

However, this is just a narrow interpretation of the themes present in the serial. In a broader sense, the theme of the serial, especially apparent toward the end, is that of oppressed femininity under the feudal hierarchy. For example, a plot line involves Hung-Mo finding a silk handkerchief with a poem embroidered on it. That poem, expressing the frustration of being trapped in the Forbidden City and the longing for life outside the palace, is later revealed to be written by Consort Yu. Even though Consort Yu has been originally characterized as power-thirsty and ruthless, the audience sees into her deeper, more sincere sentiments. The fact that she eventually chooses to stay behind in the palace trapping herself into a tragic fate, shows the extent the Forbidden City, the epitome of the rigorous Chinese feudal system, which shackles the women that live within it.

There are many preconceptions and even myths about a place as exclusive as the Forbidden City. The women in the serial are just behaving as such—cunning, cruel, betraying—in order to survive in addition to securing their imperial status. Feminine roles in feudal times are restricted, and they are even more so on the pinnacle of Chinese feudal hierarchy which is the Forbidden City. Audiences and critics noted that all the characters were well-developed and none were pure good or evil, which was different and refreshing for TVB drama series. The series overall sparked an overwhelming response from audiences. It created an incredibly high rating, peaking at 44 points, just below War of the Genders.

Response and Viewership 
The show was not without its critics. Some sociologists, psychologists, and academics criticized the show as promoting hatred due to its consistent scheming plot and backstabbing as a "natural" matter, and fears that the drama will twist the youth's perception of social relationships in general. When one such psychologist was asked about his views concerning the series, he stated "I think we must remind ourselves that even if the intentions of this [War and Beauty] are represented as merely fictitious harm, we should still focus on this harm nonetheless, especially when it's in respect to our youth". However, many ordinary citizens simply believe the show was a reflection of the real world. The creators and fans alike denied such existence of 'harm', and that there are no such subliminal connotations behind the series.

Time Out Hong Kong named War and Beauty among the best 17 Hong Kong television dramas of all time.

Awards and nominations

TVB Anniversary Awards (2004) 
Best Drama Award

My Favorite Actor in a Leading Role award went to Bowie Lam for his role as Suen Bak Yeung

My Favorite Actress in a Leading Role award went to Gigi Lai for her role as Yuk Ying

My Favorite Powerhouse Actress Award went to Sheren Tang for her role as Yu Yuet.

My Favorite Powerhouse Actor award went to Chan Hung Lit for his role as Suen Ching Wah.

My Favorite Television Character Award went to Sheren Tang, Bowie Lam, Charmaine Sheh, Moses Chan, Gigi Lai for their roles.

This drama is considered the best drama in TVB production in year 2004.

This drama also won the Most Favourite Drama in Astro Wah Lai Toi Drama Awards 2005.

Sheh won the Most Favourite Actress in Astro Wah Lai Toi Drama Awards 2005.

After Sheren Tang won the TVB Best Actress award in 2009 and 2010, War and Beauty became the TVB drama with the most Best Actress winners. Other TVB Best Actress winners in the series are Maggie Cheung Ho-Yee, Gigi Lai, and Charmaine Sheh who won their respective Best Actress awards in 2003, 2004 and 2006 (and in 2014, second time win for Charmaine Sheh).

Home video releases

War and Beauty was released on DVD and VCD a few months after its finale, and was a bestseller. It also became the first TVB drama to receive a DVD release, albeit a limited one. The DVD box was made of shiny gold cloth, with the drama's title woven on it with gold thread.

See also
Corruption
Forbidden City
Ranks of Imperial Consorts in China
Harem
Beyond the Realm of Conscience
Dae Jang Geum
The Queen of All

References

External links
 Official Page of War and Beauty in TVB

TVB dramas
Television series set in the Qing dynasty
2004 Hong Kong television series debuts
2004 Hong Kong television series endings